The Bay Haven School is a historic school in Sarasota, Florida, United States. It is located at 2901 West Tamiami Circle.

History 
The Bay Haven School would open in 1926 with M. Leo Elliott being the architect and was built for $77,000 being designed in a Mediterranean Revival style. The school was built at the advice of city planner John Nolen who recommended that two schools be built in the outlying residential areas of the city located in the north and south. It would be racially integrated in 1962 being the first elementary school in the county to do so along with the first to have a Kindergarten in it starting in 1964.

On April 23, 1984, it was added to the U.S. National Register of Historic Places.

References

External links

 Sarasota County listings at National Register of Historic Places
 Florida's Office of Cultural and Historical Programs
 Sarasota County listings
 Bay Haven School of Basics Plus

National Register of Historic Places in Sarasota County, Florida
Buildings and structures in Sarasota, Florida
School buildings on the National Register of Historic Places in Florida